The 1934 William & Mary Indians football team represented William & Mary during the 1934 college football season.

Schedule

References

William and Mary
William & Mary Tribe football seasons
William and Mary Indians football